Durham County Cricket Club (rebranded as Durham Cricket in February 2019) is one of eighteen first-class county clubs within the domestic cricket structure of England and Wales. It represents the historic county of Durham. Founded in 1882, Durham held minor status for over a century and was a prominent member of the Minor Counties Championship, winning the competition seven times. In 1992, the club joined the County Championship and the team was elevated to senior status as an official first-class team. Durham has been classified as an occasional List A team from 1964, then as a full List A team from 1992; and as a senior Twenty20 team since the format's introduction in 2003.

Durham CCC competes in the Specsavers County Championship, the Royal London One-Day Cup and in the North Group of the NatWest t20 Blast. They won the County Championship in 2008 for the first time, retained the trophy in the 2009 season, and then won it for a third time in 2013. In one-day competition, they won the 50-over Friends Provident Trophy in 2007 and the inaugural 50-over Royal London One-Day Cup in 2014. Having been relegated from Division One of the County Championship as part of the conditions for a package of financial support from the ECB, Durham has played in Division Two of the County Championship ever since the 2017 season.

The club's limited overs kit colours are yellow and blue in the Royal London One-Day Cup, and also yellow and blue colours in the t20 Blast. Durham is currently sponsored by several companies including Emirates and Port of Tyne, as well as 188Bet as their betting partner. The team was sponsored by Northern Rock prior to the bank's nationalisation in 2008. The club is based at the Riverside Ground in Chester-le-Street, which is one of the newest additions to the English Test match circuit, hosting its first match – the second 2003 England v Zimbabwe Test – from 5 to 7 June.

Honours

First XI honours 
 County Championship: 3
 2008, 2009, 2013
 Gillette/NatWest/C&G/Friends Provident Trophy: 1
 2007
 Royal London One-Day Cup: 1
 2014
 Sunday League/Pro 40/National League (2nd Division): 1
 2007
 Minor Counties Championship: 7
 1895 (shared), 1900 (shared), 1901, 1926, 1930, 1976, 1980, 1981, 1984
 MCCA Knockout Trophy: 1
 1985

Second XI honours 
 Second XI Championship: 3
 2008, 2016, 2018
 Second XI Trophy: 0

History

Earliest cricket in Durham 
Cricket probably did not reach Durham until the 18th century. The earliest reference is a game at Raby Castle on or soon after 5 August 1751 between the Earl of Northumberland's XI and the Duke of Cleveland's XI. The game was commemorated by a ballad which starts:
Durham City has been dull so long,
No bustle at all to show;
But now the rage of all the throng
Is at cricketing to go.
As it happens, there was a return game soon afterwards at Stanwick, near Richmond, and that is the earliest reference to cricket in Yorkshire.

The first recorded match of representative cricket in the county took place in 1848 at Sunderland, between an All England XII and a Bishopwearmouth 22. Despite their extra numbers the cricketers of Bishopwearmouth were comprehensively outplayed as All England's scores of 129 and 143 dwarfed their own 56 and 59.

The first team to carry the name of 'Durham County' played an MCC team in 1876 and went on to take on the touring Australians in 1878, winning by 71 runs, and again in 1880, losing by an innings and 38, with the great Fred Spofforth taking 17 wickets for 66.

Origin of club 
Durham CCC was founded as an official entity on 23 May 1882, and the nascent club played its first competitive match on 12 June of that year, beating Northumberland by 4 wickets at the Ashbrooke Ground, Sunderland. The club established an enviable record as a minor county: becoming the first minor county to beat a first-class county in the Gillette Cup (defeating Yorkshire in round one in 1973, and then in 1985 beating Derbyshire at the same stage); winning the Minor Counties Championship a record-equalling seven times between 1901 and 1984; and putting together a record of 65 matches without defeat between 1976 and 1982 that remains unbroken.

Durham as a first-class county 

Early in 1989, the club began the process of applying to become a first-class cricketing county and join the County Championship. First-class status was awarded on 6 December 1991, with Durham becoming the first new first-class county for 70 years. Their first season in the County Championship was the 1992 season.

For over a decade after gaining their status, Durham were not distinguished by marked success as a first-class county. In the 2004 season they finished bottom of the two-division County Championship, sixth out of ten teams in the one-day National Cricket League and fifth out of six teams in the Northern Division of the Twenty20 Cup.

However, in 2005 under the captaincy of Australian Mike Hussey Durham finished second and achieved promotion in both the County Championship and the one-day National Cricket League. Hussey was prevented from returning to the Riverside in 2006 as he was contracted to the Australian international team; and with vice-captain Paul Collingwood away on English international team duty Dale Benkenstein was captain for 2006.

Durham had mixed success in the 2006 season, finishing second in the North Division of the C&G Trophy. However, Durham were poor in the Twenty20 cup, finishing last in the North Division and only managing 2 victories, both against Lancashire. The Pro40 campaign started fairly well, with Durham taking 4 points from the first 4 games with a win, a loss, a tie and a no result. However, several defeats left them needing a win against the champions elect, Essex, in the final game of the season. They managed the victory, but other results did not go their way and they ended up being relegated in 8th place. The Championship season also began with success, but mediocre results in the middle of the season left Durham hanging above the relegation zone by just half a point going into the last game of the season. Durham needed more points than their rivals Yorkshire, but looked in trouble when Darren Lehmann hit a career-best 339 in the first innings. Achieving just one bowling bonus point meant that Durham needed to score 400 without losing more than 5 wickets and then draw the game.

However, one other team could also be relegated. Nottinghamshire needed just 3 points to avoid the drop at the start of the matches, but only managed 1 point as they were soundly beaten by Sussex. This meant that Durham needed only to score 400 (for maximum batting points) and force a draw. At 191–6 this looked unlikely. But a record-breaking stand of 315 between Benkenstein and Ottis Gibson made it possible. Gibson was out for 155, the highest first-class score in his career. Durham then collapsed again to 518 all out, needing work to be done in the second innings. This was provided by Garry Park, who hit a maiden first-class century (100*) as Durham played out a draw, leaving themselves and Yorkshire in the first division.

In recent times, Durham has seen a number of their top players make an impact on the England side. Collingwood (who is the first Durham CCC player to hit a Test century and double century), Steve Harmison and Liam Plunkett have all established themselves in the national squad with Phil Mustard also representing England in the one day format. Graham Onions was added to the test side for the home series against the West Indies in 2009. Both Ben Stokes and Scott Borthwick made their England ODI debuts in August 2011.

For the 2011 season, Durham County Cricket Club wished to return to a more traditional arrangement and have insisted on a smart dress code including jackets for gentlemen at all games.

Friends Provident Trophy 2007 

During the 2007 season the club won its first major trophy, the Friends Provident Trophy, by beating the 2005 winners Hampshire Hawks in a game which started on 18 finishing a day later due to rain. The toss between Dale Benkenstein and Shane Warne was won by the latter who sent Durham into bat. Fellow Aussie Michael Di Venuto and wicket-keeper Phil Mustard opened the batting. Mustard looked strong from ball 1 but Di Venuto was a little shaky and was dismissed by Hampshire's West Indies international Daren Powell and caught by Michael Carberry. Ex-Scotland u-19 captain Kyle Coetzer and Shiv Chanderpaul made significant contributions (61 and 78 respectively), the latter being run-out. Captain Benkenstein made a quickfire 61 off 43 deliveries. Durham finished their innings on 312–5.

Michael Lumb and ex-captain John Crawley opened for the Hawks, the former departing for a golden duck, caught at second slip by Di Venuto. Zimbabwean Sean Ervine was next in, immediately edging to second slip in identical fashion leaving Ottis Gibson on a hat-trick. Kevin Pietersen survived that ball, but was soon back in the pavilion with 12. John Crawley managed a resilient 68 but was bowled by Paul Collingwood who was to finish with 3–33. The rain came down and play was delayed until the following day.

With the fall of Nic Pothas (47) and Dimitri Mascarenhas (12) the tail was exposed and was quickly disposed of with Hampshire finishing on 187, handing Durham a historic win. Veteran Ottis Gibson was named man of the match for his spell of 3–24 at the start of the Hampshire innings, which included wickets with his first two deliveries.

County Championship wins 
In September 2008, Durham claimed their first County Championship by winning their final match of the season at Canterbury, against Kent. Durham won the match by an innings, condemning Kent to be relegated, and moving 8 points clear of runners up, Nottinghamshire. Twelve months later they retained their title defeating Nottinghamshire by an innings and 52 runs at a sun soaked Riverside Ground in front of 5,000 jubilant supporters. In September 2013 they won the Championship for a third time, beating Nottinghamshire by 8 wickets at Chester le Street.

Ground history 

The club's acceptance into first-class cricket was made conditional on the building of a new Test match-standard cricket ground. Work began on the new ground at the Riverside, a spectacular location overlooked by Lumley Castle, in 1990, and the ground hosted its first game, Durham v Warwickshire, on 18 May 1995.

Development of the Riverside Ground has continued until the present day, and in 2003 the Riverside Ground was raised to Test match status. The ground has been used for six England Test matches, against Zimbabwe in 2003, Bangladesh in 2005, two against West Indies in June 2007 and May 2009, an Ashes Test Match against Australia in 2013, and against Sri Lanka in 2016. England have won all six of these tests.

As part of the conditions of a package of financial support announced in October 2016, the ECB imposed a number of sanctions on Durham County Cricket Club, including removal of the club's eligibility to bid to stage Test cricket at the Riverside Ground. The club will still be eligible to bid to host one-day and Twenty20 international matches.

This following table gives details of every venue at which Durham have hosted a first-class or List A cricket match:

  Located in Newcastle upon Tyne, historically part of Northumberland.

Players 
Since Durham's induction as a first-class county, each player has been allocated a unique squad number. The first 11 numbers were allocated in batting order from the club's first game, and subsequent numbers have been allocated in order of appearance.

Current squad 
 No. denotes the player's squad number, as worn on the back of their shirt.
  denotes players with international caps.

Lists of players and club captains 
 List of Durham CCC players
 List of Durham cricket captains

Durham players with international caps 
Durham county cricketers who have during their career also represented their national team in Test cricket or One Day International cricket.

England
  Ian Blackwell
  Scott Borthwick
  Ian Botham
  Simon Brown
  Paul Collingwood
  Geoff Cook
  Graeme Fowler
   Gavin Hamilton
  Steve Harmison
  Keaton Jennings
  Wayne Larkins
  John Morris
  Phil Mustard
  Graham Onions
  Paul Parker
  Liam Plunkett
  Martin Saggers
  Ben Stokes
  Mark Stoneman
  Vince Wells
  Mark Wood
 Alex Lees

Australia
  Cameron Bancroft
  David Boon
   Michael Di Venuto
  John Hastings
  Brad Hodge
  Michael Hussey
  Dean Jones
  Simon Katich
  Mick Lewis
  Martin Love
  Jimmy Maher
  Ashley Noffke
  Marcus North
  D'Arcy Short
  Shaun Tait
  David Warner
  Brad Williams

Canada
   Anderson Cummins

India
  Varun Aaron
  Axar Patel
  Manoj Prabhakar
  Javagal Srinath
  Ravichandran Ashwin

Ireland
  Peter Chase
  Barry McCarthy
  Stuart Poynter

Italy
   Michael Di Venuto

New Zealand
  Nathan Astle
  Tom Latham
  Scott Styris
  Ross Taylor
  Paul Wiseman
 Will Young

Pakistan
  Shoaib Akhtar

Scotland
  James Brinkley
  Kyle Coetzer
   Gavin Hamilton
  Michael Jones
  Calum MacLeod
  Gavin Main
  Moneeb Iqbal

South Africa
  Dale Benkenstein
  Stephen Cook
  Herschelle Gibbs
  Neil McKenzie
  Aiden Markram
  David Miller
  Albie Morkel
  Dewald Pretorius
  Imran Tahir

Sri Lanka
  Kumar Sangakkara

West Indies
  Gareth Breese
  Sherwin Campbell
  Shivnarine Chanderpaul
   Anderson Cummins
  Ottis Gibson
  Reon King

Zimbabwe
  Andy Blignaut

Records

See also 
 Durham County Cricket Club seasons
 Dynamo (disambiguation)
 Durham County Football Association

Notes

References

Further reading 
 Derek Birley, A Social History of English Cricket, Aurum, 1999
 Rowland Bowen, Cricket: A History of its Growth and Development, Eyre & Spottiswoode, 1970
 Simon Hughes, From Minor to Major: Durham's First Year in the Championship, Hodder & Stoughton, 1992, 
 Playfair Cricket Annual – various editions
 Wisden Cricketers' Almanack – various editions

External sources 
 Official Durham County Cricket Club website
 BBC Wear – Riverside Cricket Ground interactive 360° Panorama
 BBC Wear – DCCC celebrate with the County Championship Trophy 2008
 Scorecard from the 2007 Friends Provident Trophy Final

 
History of County Durham
English first-class cricket teams
Cricket in County Durham
Cricket clubs established in 1882
1882 establishments in England